Podkletnoye is a rural locality (a selo) in Usmanskoye 2-ye Rural Settlement, Novousmansky District, Voronezh Oblast, Russia. The population was 179 as of 2010. There are 13 streets.

Geography 
Podkletnoye is located 9 km southeast of Novaya Usman (the district's administrative centre) by road. Parusnoye is the nearest rural locality.

References 

Rural localities in Novousmansky District